Charmi (also Romanized as Charmī) is a village in Estakhr-e Posht Rural District, Hezarjarib District, Neka County, Mazandaran Province, Iran. At the 2006 census, its population was 20, in 6 families.

References 

Populated places in Neka County